Captain John Carnes of Salem, Massachusetts (1756–1796), was a privateer.

He served as the captain of the General Lincoln and carried letters for John Adams. He held  a letter of marque from the fledgling American government to harass, sink or capture British and allied shipping.

He served from February–March 1782 as captain of the privateer Porus, during which time he led an expedition of four privateer vessels against the British-held island of Tortola, but with disappointing results. The plan to surprise the island was discovered and failing that the expedition, after some hot exchanges of cannon fire with pursued shipping, withdrew due to a British squadron being alerted to their presence in the area.

He later brought back the first shipload of pepper bought directly from the natives of the Dutch Spice Islands and thus opened the way to that trade in America and made a fortune in the process.

Legacy
His portrait hangs in the Salem Historical Society Museum.

Citations and references 
Citations

References
 Privateer, a narrative of a captain Beecham. http://www.theislandwiki.org/index.php/A_privateer%27s_tale 
Elias Hasket Derby and his Times. https://books.google.com/books?id=yKweAQAAMAAJ&pg=PA185&lpg=PA185&dq=captain+jonathan+carnes&source=bl&ots=eLCPDcwd4w&sig=uWS9oeF7CuO9MzrVfdosqhER7iE&hl=en&sa=X&ei=Qrk0U8X-CYSUqwHb3YDYDA&ved=0CCYQ6AEwADgK
https://books.google.com/books?id=yKweAQAAMAAJ&pg=PA185&lpg=PA185&dq=captain+jonathan+carnes&source=bl&ots=eLCPDcwd4w&sig=uWS9oeF7CuO9MzrVfdosqhER7iE&hl=en&sa=X&ei=Qrk0U8X-CYSUqwHb3YDYDA&ved=0CCYQ6AEwADgK

American privateers
People from Salem, Massachusetts
1756 births
1796 deaths